Battle of Northern Burma and Western Yunnan (Chinese: 滇西緬北戰役 October 1943 – March 1945) was the name of the Chinese campaign with their allies in the 1943–45 Burma Campaign. The campaign ended in an Allied victory.

It is one of the large-scale battles of the War of Resistance Against Japanese Aggression, located in the border area between Yunnan Province, China and northern Myanmar, starting at the beginning of December 1943. The purpose of the battle is to open up the China-India Highway. At the end of March 1945, the Chinese Expeditionary Force, the British Army, and the Merrill's Marauders joined forces in Muse, Burma (Myanmar), while the Japanese Army lost the North Burma Stronghold.

The Allied Forces were jointly formed by the troops of China, the United States and the United Kingdom. Among them, the Chinese participating forces included the Chinese Army in India and the Chinese Expeditionary Force. The commander-in-chief of the campaign was General Wei Lihuang of the Chinese National Army, and the deputy commander of the campaign was General Joseph Stilwell of the US Army. The main force of the Japanese army was the Japanese Burmese front. The commander of the battle was Masakazu Kawabe, then Heitaro Kimura, later Shinichi Tanaka and others. The total strength was more than 400,000 for Allied and 150,000 for Japan..

The Battle of Northern Myanmar and Western Yunnan lasted one and a half years. At the cost of 31,443 people killed and 35,948 wounded, the Allies killed more than 25,000 Japanese soldiers, reopened southwest China to the Burma Road, and recovered all the lost land on the west bank of the Salween River in western Yunnan.

Background
At the turn of spring and summer in 1942, the Japanese army captured Burma and immediately prepared to attack west Yunnan. They were expected to fight along Burma Road, conquer Yunnan and threaten Chongqing. On May 4, 1942, the Japanese army invaded Longling County, and at the same time dispatched 54 aircraft to carry out a violent bombing of Baoshan, Yunnan, the  Millennium Ancient City; on the 10th, the Japanese army invaded the border city of Tengchong. At this point, a large area west of the Salween River (Nu River) fell into the hands of the Japanese army. The 71st Army of the Chinese Expeditionary Force set up defenses on the east bank of the Nu River, repeatedly frustrated the Japanese army’s attempt to move eastward, and thus stabilized the war situation, and confronted it across the river for two years.

At that time, after the Burma Road, which was once the only land international transportation artery, was cut off, a large amount of military supplies to China could only be transported by the US Air Force through "The Hump" with much difficulty and no security. In order to regain control of the Burma Road, the six divisions of the Chinese Expeditionary Forces in India and the British and Indian forces jointly launched a counterattack against the Japanese army in northern Myanmar in late October 1943, and achieved initial results. On April 17, the following year, the Chinese Expeditionary Force carried out a counter-attack plan for crossing the river.

Battles in Battle of Northern Burma and Western Yunnan
 Battle of Yupang October - December 1943
 Battle of Lashio January 1944
 Battle of Maingkwan February - 5 March 1944
 Battle of Mogaung March 1944
 Siege of Myitkyina April - August 1944
 Battle of Mount Song May - September 1944
 Battle of Mongyu December 1944 - January 1945
 Battle of Lashio March 1945
 Battle of Hsipaw March 1945

References

See also
 China Burma India Theater of World War II
 Burma Campaign 1944-1945
 Battle of Yunnan-Burma Road
 Northern Combat Area Command

South-East Asian theatre of World War II
Battles of the Second Sino-Japanese War
Military history of Burma during World War II
Military history of Yunnan
1943 in Burma
1944 in Burma
1945 in Burma